Oegoconia deauratella is a species of gelechioid moth. It is known from most of Europe, as well as North America, where it has been recorded from Québec, Ontario and Michigan.

The wingspan is 11–15 mm.

The larva probably feed on dried and decaying vegetable matter.

References

Moths described in 1854
Oegoconia
Moths of Europe